Polsat JimJam is a children's television channel in Poland which also serves as the regional variation of the international children's television channel JimJam. The channel broadcasts the same lineup of programming as other international versions of JimJam, but Polsat JimJam broadcasts according to local time. It also carries Polish commercials and also has Polish audio and subtitles. The channel was started as a joint venture between AMC Networks International and Polsat Group on 19 November 2009.

References

Polsat
Television channels in Poland
Television channels and stations established in 2009